Adora Cruises (CSSC Carnival Cruise Shipping) is a Chinese-British-American cruise line that was scheduled to begin operation in 2020, but was delayed due to COVID-19 pandemic.

History
CSSC Carnival was founded in October 2015 as a joint venture, worth about $4 billion over ten years, between British-American cruise line Carnival Corporation & plc, Chinese sovereign wealth fund China Investment Corporation, and Chinese shipbuilder China State Shipbuilding Corporation (CSSC).  CSSC Carnival is headquartered in Hong Kong and is majority owned by the Chinese shareholders, which collectively own 60% of the company, with Carnival holding the remainder.  In September 2016, the company announced plans to order two new ships, with options for two more, with deliveries planned to begin in 2022.  In February 2017, two more options were added to the order, and it was announced that the vessels would be built at the Shanghai Waigaoqiao Shipbuilding Company through a joint venture between CSSC, owner of the shipyard, and Italian shipbuilder Fincantieri, with the first ship to be delivered in 2023.  In November 2018, the contract for the first two Chinese-built ships was formally signed at a cost of about $1.5 billion, and CSSC Carnival announced that it planned to purchase two ships already in service, to enter its fleet beginning in late 2019.

Fleet
Adora Cruises will begin operations with two ships purchased from Costa Cruises, Costa Atlantica in 2020 and Costa Mediterranea in 2021.  

The first Chinese-built vessel, to be constructed off of the Vista-class design, is expected to be delivered in 2023, with the sister ship following in 2024. If all four options are exercised, a new ship will be delivered annually through 2028.

References

Carnival Corporation & plc
China Investment Corporation
Shipping companies of Hong Kong
Cruise lines